Counted amongst the honours achieved by the Manly Warringah Sea Eagles since their first season in 1947 are eight 8 NRL Premierships and one World Club Challenge. The club's players and coaches have also received several individual awards.

Media and Association Awards
{| class="wikitable" width="75%" style="font-size:90%"
|- bgcolor="#efefef"
! colspan=11 |Manly Warringah Sea Eagles
|-
|Rugby League Immortal  Bob Fulton (1981 – Original Inductee)
|-
|Team Of The Century  Ken Irvine (Wing), Bob Fulton (Reserve)
|-
|ARL Hall of Fame  Ken Irvine, Bob Fulton
|-
|NSWRL Team Of Century  Ken Irvine (Wing), Bob Fulton (Five-Eight), Roy Bull (Reserve)
|-
|Country (CRL) Team Of Century  Bob Fulton (Five-Eight)
|-
|Illawarra Rugby League Team Of Century  Bob Fulton (Five-Eight)
|-
|Top 100 Players (Australia)  Kerry Boustead, Roy Bull, Graham Eadie, Bob Fulton, Ken Irvine, Eddie Lumsden, John O'Neill
|-
|Indigenous Rugby League Team of the Century   Dale Shearer (Wing), Cliff Lyons (Lock), Mal Cockrane (Hooker)
|-
|Rothmans Medal  Graham Eadie (1974), Mal Cochrane (1986)
|-
|Dally M Awards  Cliff Lyons (1990, 1994), Matt Orford (2008)
|-
|Player of the Year  Cliff Lyons (1990, 1994), Matt Orford (2008)
|-
|Silver Dally M  Ian Roberts (1993), Cliff Lyons (1995)
|-
|Best Fullback  Graham Eadie (1983), Matthew Ridge (1995)
|-
|Best Winger  John Ribot (1982), Kerry Boustead (1983)
|-
|Best Centre  Michael O'Connor (1987, 1988), Jamie Lyon (2010, 2011, 2013, 2014)
|-
|Best Five-Eight  Cliff Lyons (1990, 1994)
|-
|Best Halfback  Matt Orford (2008), Daly Cherry-Evans (2014)
|-
|Best Lock Forward  Des Hasler (1991), Steve Menzies (2002), Ben Kennedy (2005, 2006)
|-
|Best Second Rower  Paul Vautin (1983), Noel Cleal (1984, 1986), Steve Menzies (1994, 1995, 1998), Anthony Watmough (2007, 2009), Glenn Stewart (2008)
|-
|Best Hooker  Mal Cochrane (1986, 1987), Jim Serdaris (1996), Geoff Toovey (1999)
|-
|Best Prop Forward  Dave Brown (1983), Martin Bella (1990), Ian Roberts (1993, 1994)
|-
|Top Try-Scorer  Bob Fulton (1972, 1973, 1976), Kevin Junee (1974), Russel Gartner (1977), Tom Mooney (1979), Phil Blake (1983, 1986), Steve Menzies (1995), Terry Hill (1997 - ARL), Brett Stewart (2008), David Williams (2013)
|-
|Top Points Scorer  Ron Rowles (1951, 1952, 1953, 1954), Graham Eadie (1974, 1975, 1976), Matthew Ridge (1995)
|-
|Rookie of the Year  Phil Blake (1982), Jack Elsegood (1993), Steve Menzies (1994), Daly Cherry-Evans (2011)
|-
|Captain of the Year  Ben Kennedy (2006), Jason King (2012), Jamie Lyon (2012, 2014)
|-
|Coach of the Year  Bob Fulton (1983)
|-
|Dave Brown Medal*  Dennis Ward (1972), Bob Fulton (1973), Graham Eadie (1976, 1978)
|-
|Clive Churchill Medal  Cliff Lyons (1987), Geoff Toovey (1996), Brent Kite (2008), Glenn Stewart (2011), Daly Cherry-Evans (2013)
|-
|'''Rugby League Week Player of the Year  John Mayes (1973), Bob Fulton (1975), Phil Sigsworth (1983), Cliff Lyons (1994)
|-
|Norwich Rising Star – Rookie of the Year  Jack Elsegood (1993), John Hopoate (1995)
|-
|Rugby League Players Association 
|-
|Players’ Player  Ben Kennedy (2006)
|-
|Best Country Player  Brent Kite (2006)
|-
|Rookie Of The Year  David Williams (2008)
|-
|Clubman Of The Year <td align="left"> Jason King (2008)
|-
|New Zealand Player of the Year <td align="left"> Darrell Williams (1989), Kieran Foran (2013)
|-
|NSW Player of the Year <td align="left"> Roy Bull (1954), Bob Fulton (1972, 1973)
|-
|Sun Herald Best and Fairest <td align="left"> Rex Mossop (1958), Dennis Ward (1968)
|-
|Ken Stephen Memorial Award <td align="left"> Ian Roberts (1994), Michael Monaghan (2006)
|}
* No longer awarded. Replaced by the Clive Churchill Medal in 1986

Club honours
{| class="wikitable" width="85%" style="font-size:90%"
|- bgcolor="#efefef"
! colspan=11 |Manly Warringah Sea Eagles
|-
|Clubman of the Year  Owen Cunningham (1994), Cliff Lyons (1995), Des Hasler (1996), Geoff Toovey (1997), Craig Hancock (1998), Steve Menzies (1999, 2002), Chad Randall (2003), Albert Torrens (2004), Luke Williamson (2005), Chris Hicks (2006), Michael Monaghan (2007), Mark Bryant (2008), George Rose (2010), Michael Robertson (2011) Joe Galuvao (2012), Brett Stewart (2013), Brenton Lawrence (2014, 2016), Josh Starling (2015), Jake Trbojevic (2017), Joel Thompson (2018), Glenn Moore (2019)
|-
|Best and Fairest <td align="left"> Steve Menzies (2002), Chris Hicks (2004), Ben Kennedy (2005, 2006), Glenn Stewart (2007, 2008, 2011), Jason King (2009, 2010), Matt Ballin (2012), Anthony Watmough (2013), Brenton Lawrence (2014), Jake Trbojevic (2015, 2018, 2019), Tom Trbojevic (2016), Daly Cherry-Evans (2017)
|-
|Players’ Player <td align="left"> John Hopoate (2002), Ben Kennedy (2005), Brent Kite (2006), Brett Stewart (2007, 2015), Brent Kite (2008), George Rose (2009) Jamie Lyon (2010, 2012), Steve Matai (2011), Daly Cherry-Evans (2013), Kieran Foran (2014), Jake Trbojevic (2016, 2017), Joel Thompson (2018, 2019)
|-
|Rookie of the Year <td align="left"> Jason King (2002), Steve Matai (2005), Travis Burns (2006), Michael Bani (2007), David Williams (2008), Kieran Foran (2009), Trent Hodkinson (2010), Daly Cherry-Evans (2011), Jorge Taufua (2012), Peta Hiku (2013), Jesse Sene-Lefao (2014), Tom Trbojevic (2015), Addin Fonua-Blake (2016), Brian Kelly (2017), Reuben Garrick (2019)
|-
|Members Best and Fairest <td align="left"> Ben Kennedy (2005, 2006), Brett Stewart (2007, 2014, 2015), Anthony Watmough (2007, 2009), Matt Orford (2008), Jamie Lyon (2010, 2012), Kieran Foran (2011), Daly Cherry-Evans (2013, 2018), Jake Trbojevic (2016, 2017, 2019)
|}

Representative Players
Below are the players to play representative football whilst in Manly colours. Notable Internationals to play for Manly, but not represent from the club, include New Zealand players Jock Butterfield, Trevor Kilkelly, Adrian Shelford and Tasesa Lavea, and Great Britain players Mal Reilly, Phil Lowe, Steve Norton, Andy Goodway, Kevin Ward and Welsh dual rugby international John Devereux.

Below are Manly players that have represented Australia at the schoolboys level. Players in bold went on to make their first grade debut for Manly Warringah.
Updated May 2017

All-Time Greatest Teams
In recent times the Manly Warringah Sea Eagles Football Club has recognised their players, past and present, with teams announced to reflect the best squads up to that point. The 2006 Dream Team selectors featured ex-Manly Warringah secretary Ken Arthurson (the Godfather of Manly), respected League writer Ian Heads, MWRLFC Chairman Kerry Sibraa and journalist Phil Rothfield.

Centenary Honours

Premiership Honours

Premierships (8/73)

* This denotes the Grand Final replay. The original match was drawn 11-all and attracted 51,510 to the SCG.** The 40–0 win over Melbourne in 2008 is the league record winning margin in a Grand Final.

Runners-up (11/73)

* Melbourne Storm were stripped of their 2007 premiership win in 2010 following major salary cap breaches by the club. The NRL lists no premiers for the season.

Minor Premierships (9/73)

World Club Challenges (1/3)

* All games played in England

Wooden Spoons (0/73)
The Sea Eagles have never finished last in a season. They are the only pre-1982 club to have never finished with the wooden spoon.

Finals (44/73)
The Sea Eagles qualified for the NSWRL/ARL/NRL finals in the following years. 
1951, 1955, 1957, 1958, 1959, 1961, 1966, 1968, 1970, 1971, 1972, 1973, 1974, 1975, 1976, 1977, 1978, 1981, 1982, 1983, 1984, 1986, 1987, 1988, 1990, 1991, 1993, 1994, 1995, 1996, 1997, 1998, 2005, 2006, 2007, 2008, 2009, 2010, 2011, 2012, 2013, 2014, 2017 and 2019.

Premiership Teams

1972

 (c)

1973

 (c)

1976

 (c)

1978

 (vc)

 (c)

1987

 (c)
 (vc)

1996

 (vc)

 (c)

2008

 (vc)
 (c)

2011

 (vc)

 (c)

World Club Champions

2009

 (c)

References

External links

Honours
Rugby league trophies and awards
National Rugby League lists
Sydney-sport-related lists